The 1910 Kentucky State College Wildcats football team represented Kentucky State College—now known as the University of Kentucky—during the 1910 college football season.

Schedule

References

Kentucky State College
Kentucky Wildcats football seasons
Kentucky State College Wildcats football